The Mongstad scandal was a crisis in the Norwegian oil company Statoil in 1987–88.

The company exceeded the NOK 8 billion budget by NOK 6 billion in upgrading the oil refinery at Mongstad. Retrospectively the reasons for the overexpenditure were attributed to bad planning, technical miscalculations and bad project management. The executives in Statoil were also accused of inability to act and for withholding information from the Norwegian Ministry of Petroleum and Energy. At the time the incident aroused considerable media attention.

The first warnings of a budget overspend came on 25 September 1987, when the over-expenditure was estimated at NOK 3,8 billion. On 20 November most of the board of directors had to resign. The board was led by chairman Inge Johansen and deputy chairman Vidkunn Hveding since 1984. The other board members who also resigned were Thor Andreassen (member since 1978), Fredrik Thoresen (member since 1984), Guttorm Hansen (member since 1986) and Toril V. Lundestad (member since 1986). The only board members not to resign were the three employee representatives. Two days later chief executive officer Arve Johnsen also resigned, at the time the only CEO in the history of the company to resign. In January 1988 reports of a possibility of the overexpenditure accumulating another billion NOK were presented. By April the anticipated overspend was believed to be in the order of NOK 8 billion, although the final sum came to NOK 6 billion.

The enormous shock effect of the Mongstad scandal should be understood in the light of the social and political situation of Norway in 1988. Statoil was at the time a limited company wholly owned by the Norwegian Ministry of Petroleum and Energy, who managed the entire profit. After the company had started to make a profit around 1980 it had become the guarantor for welfare in the country in the minds of people. The company's transfers to government treasury coffers exceeded that of income tax at the time. CEO Arve Johnsen was the man who could do nothing wrong, the Labour Party man who controlled Statoil even during a conservative government. Prime Minister Kåre Willoch's attempt to clip Statoil's wings a few years earlier had failed. And at the same time came the bankruptcy in the largest bank, Den norske Creditbank that had announced the start of the fall of the Yuppie age.

The media attention on the Mongstad scandal in 1988 was enormous, and was front-page material almost daily. The tabloid newspapers battles fiercely in trying to visualise the, at the time, almost unimaginable size of NOK 6 billion. The sum was creatively recalculated in kindergarten places, retirement home places, fighter jets etc. Sometimes the coverage became absurd with parallels such as Dagbladet's example of 6 billion = enough to buy one AG3 assault rifle for each of the country's 4,5 million inhabitants. For years the term one mong was used as a synonym for the number 6 billion.

References

Corporate scandals
History of the petroleum industry
Equinor
1987 in Norway
1988 in Norway